Pohlmann's Hall is a building located in Jersey City, Hudson County, New Jersey, United States. The building was added to the National Register of Historic Places on September 5, 1985.

History
The building was built in 1874 by Diedrich Pohlmann and used as an athletic club. In 1918 the building was purchased by L.O. Koven Boiler Company and used as the company's headquarters. In 1963 the building was purchased by J. L. Kessler Company. The building was sold to the present owners in 1984 and converted into condominiums.

See also
National Register of Historic Places listings in Hudson County, New Jersey
Schuetzen Park
Palisade Avenue (Hudson Palisades)

References

Buildings and structures in Jersey City, New Jersey
Commercial buildings on the National Register of Historic Places in New Jersey
Commercial buildings completed in 1874
German-American culture in New Jersey
National Register of Historic Places in Hudson County, New Jersey
Apartment buildings in Jersey City, New Jersey
New Jersey Register of Historic Places
1874 establishments in New Jersey